Ishtiryak (İştiräk) is a rural locality (a village) in Arslanovsky Selsoviet, Buzdyaksky District, Bashkortostan, Russia. The population was 11 as of 2010. There is 1 street.

Geography 
Ishtiryak is located 26 km northwest of Buzdyak (the district's administrative centre) by road. Yulduzly is the nearest rural locality.

References 

Rural localities in Buzdyaksky District